The history of international law in Russia is marked by several important periods, among these:

Pre-Petrine international law;
Peter I of Russia's reforms & Russia's Europeanization/Westernization, particularly in legal thought;
18th Century;
19th Century and liberalization;
Friedrich Martens
Soviet international law;
Evgeny A. Korovin
Post-Soviet harmonization with international law;

In Russian legal history, international and comparative method dates back to the sixteenth century.

See also

 Russian legal history 
History of public international law

References

Legal history of Russia
Law in the Russian Empire